Post magazine may refer to:

 Australasian Post, a defunct Australian weekly magazine (1864–2002) 
 Post Magazine, a British magazine
 Saturday Evening Post, an American magazine